is a Japanese weather forecaster, TV personality, and actor. Born in Zushi, Kanagawa, he is the second son of Tokyo governor Shintaro Ishihara, and brother of politicians Nobuteru Ishihara and Hirotaka Ishihara.

Biography
Ishihara was born on 15 January 1962 in Zushi, Kanagawa.

He entered Keio University in 1980 to study Economics.

He is a self-proclaimed railway enthusiast.

Works

Films
(Incomplete list)
 Kyōdan (1982)
 Ashita no Watashi no Tsukurikata (2007)
 Adrift in Tokyo (2007)

Television drama
Seibu Keisatsu (1983–84), Detective Jun Godai
Taiyō ni Hoero! (1984–86), Detective Yu "Microcomputer" Mizuki
Yoshitsune (2005), Minamoto no Noriyori
Tenchijin (2009), Fukushima Masanori
Yū-san no Nyōbō (2021), Shintaro Ishihara

Variety shows
Waratte Iitomo!
Zawatsuku Kinyō-bi (2018–present)

TV commercials
 NTT Town Page (since 2007)

References

External links
 

1962 births
People from Zushi, Kanagawa
Television meteorologists
Japanese television personalities
Fuji News Network personalities
20th-century Japanese male actors
21st-century Japanese male actors
Male actors from Kanagawa Prefecture
Keio University alumni
Living people
Shintaro Ishihara